FP may refer to:

Arts, media and entertainment

Music
 Fortepiano, an early version of the piano
 Fortepiano (musical dynamic), an Italian musical term meaning 'loud soft'
 Flux Pavilion, a British dubstep artist
 Francis Poulenc, an early 20th century pianist and composer
 FP (catalogue) - of his compositions.

Publications
 Financial Post, a Canadian business newspaper, published from 1907 to 1998, now National Post
 Foreign Policy, a bimonthly American magazine founded in 1970

Other media
 Facepunch Studios, a British video game company
 The FP, a 2011 comedy film
 Fast Picket, a class of fictional artificially intelligent starship in The Culture universe of late Scottish author Iain Banks

Science and technology

Computing
 FP (complexity), in computational complexity theory, a complexity class
 FP (programming language) designed by John Backus in the 1970s
 Feature Pack, a software update for various devices which include new features
 Floating point, a numerical-representation system in computing
 Frame pointer
 Microsoft FrontPage, an HTML editor
 Functional programming, a programming paradigm
 Function point, a measurement of the business functionality an information system provides

Transportation
 F - Production, a class of race cars
 F engine, a piston engine by Mazda
 New Zealand FP class electric multiple unit (Matangi), a class of electric multiple locomotive unit

Other uses in science and technology
 False positive, in statistics, a result that indicates, inaccurately, that a condition has been fulfilled
 Ilford FP, a cubic-grain black-and-white photographic film
 Fabry–Pérot interferometer, a device in optics
 Fire protection, in the construction industry
 Fluoroprotein foam, a type of fire retardant foam
 Forensic psychiatry, a subspeciality of psychiatry related to criminology
 Cyclopentadienyliron(II) dicarbonyl group (Fp = (η5-C5H5)Fe(CO)2, colloquially pronounced as "fip"), see: cyclopentadienyliron dicarbonyl dimer (Fp2)
 Prostaglandin F receptor, a receptor on cells which mediates responses to prostaglandin F2alpha

Politics
 Freedom Party (disambiguation), the name of various political parties
 Folkpartiet, a former name of the Liberal People's Party in Sweden
 The Federalist Papers, a series of essays advocating the ratification of the United States Constitution
 Força Portugal, a Portuguese political alliance
 Force Publique (French for "public force"), the military force of the Belgian Congo during the colonial period
 Framework Programmes for Research and Technological Development of the European Union
 Fuerza Popular, a right-wing populist Fujimorist political party in Peru

Other uses
 50 metre pistol, a shooting sport formerly known as free pistol
 Facepalm, a gesture indicating frustration
 Family planning, the use of birth control and planning when to have children
 Family practice, a general practitioner or family physician 
 Finance Park, an educational program co-managed by the Stavros Institute in Pinellas County, Florida
 First person, a grammatical person referring to the speaker
 Force protection, in the US military
 French Polynesia (FIPS 10-4 country code)
 Friends Provident, a British insurance company
 Friday prayer, a congregational prayer service among Muslims
 Fp, runestone style characterized by runic bands that end with animal heads seen from above.
 The nickname of Falakata Polytechnic, West Bengal
 FP grade tea